"100 Miles and Runnin'" is a song by N.W.A from their 1990 EP of the same name. The song also appeared on the N.W.A's Greatest Hits and The Best of N.W.A. - The Strength of Street Knowledge compilation.

Background
This song is where the feud between N.W.A and former member Ice Cube begins. On Dr. Dre's second verse in this song, he raps the following lines:

"It started with five but yo one couldn't take it."
/"So now there's four 'cause the fifth couldn't make it."
"The number's even."
/"And now I'm leaving"

The line is a reference to Ice Cube and that he left the group so they were four members.

"100 Miles and Runnin'" also mentions The D.O.C.'s song "Lend Me an Ear" from his 1989 album No One Can Do It Better, which was also produced by Dre.

Music video
In November 1990, a music video directed by Eric Meza was aired and released. In the video the intro begins with N.W.A members being arrested by the police and exactly when the song begins they flee and appear on several scenes including, jumping onto the roof of a moving car, fleeing to back of a van and others. In the end someone wears a baseball cap similar to the ones the band members wear, so the police get into the house and grab the cap, and they understand that it's someone else dressed similarly to the N.W.A members. Also in the middle of the video a car is seen exploding while the N.W.A members run. "100 Miles and Runnin'" also charted at #54 at U.S. Hot R&B.

Controversy

"100 Miles and Runnin'" had sampled a two-second guitar chord from Funkadelic's "Get Off Your Ass and Jam" by lowering the pitch of the sample and playing it five times, but had paid no compensation to the owner, Bridgeport Music. Bridgeport brought the issue to a federal judge, who ruled that the sample was not in violation of copyright law. Later on, though, the decision was reversed by the U.S. Court of Appeals for the Sixth Circuit, who interpreted and ruled that using any sample without the original creator's permission was in violation of the law.

Charts

References

N.W.A songs
1990 songs
1990 singles
Songs written by MC Ren
Songs written by The D.O.C.
Song recordings produced by Dr. Dre
Songs about police brutality
Ruthless Records singles
Priority Records singles
Diss tracks